Hostouň is the name of several locations in the Czech Republic:

 Hostouň (Domažlice District), a town in the Plzeň Region
 Hostouň (Kladno District), a village in the Central Bohemian Region